Adriana Mihaela Burtică (born 29 July 1976) is a Romanian football defender, currently playing for CS Brazi in the Romanian First League. She has played the UEFA Women's Cup with Regal Bucharest and Codru Anenii Noi.

She is a member of the Romanian national team since 1998.

References

1976 births
Living people
Romanian women's footballers
Romania women's international footballers
Expatriate women's footballers in Moldova
Women's association football defenders